The Tanuševci operation was a joint Macedonian-KFOR operation to regain control of the village of Tanuševci which was previously infiltrated by NLA rebels. The Operation was successful with NATO-led KFOR forces capturing the village and Macedonian Army units sweeping the area and ambushing the retreating NLA.

References

Macedonia (region)
History of North Macedonia
History of Kosovo
2001 insurgency in Macedonia
2001 in the Republic of Macedonia
Battles in 2001